The 46th Directors Guild of America Awards, honoring the outstanding directorial achievements in films, documentary and television in 1993, were presented on March 5, 1994 at the Beverly Hilton and the Russian Tea Room. The ceremony in Beverly Hills was hosted by Carl Reiner and the ceremony in New York was hosted by Charlie Rose. The feature film nominees were announced on January 24, 1994 and the other nominations were announced on January 31, 1994 and February 2, 1994.

Winners and nominees

Film

Television

Commercials

D.W. Griffith Award
 Robert Altman

Lifetime Achievement in Sports Direction
 Doug Wilson

Frank Capra Achievement Award
 Peter A. Runfolo

Robert B. Aldrich Service Award
 Burt Bluestein

Franklin J. Schaffner Achievement Award
 James Wall

References

External links
 

Directors Guild of America Awards
1993 film awards
1993 television awards
Direct
Direct
Directors
1994 in Los Angeles
1994 in New York City
March 1994 events in the United States